Nawabzada Mirza Jamiluddin Ahmed Khan PP, HI (20 January 1925 – 23 November 2015), also known as Jamiluddin Aali or Aaliji, was a Pakistani poet, critic, playwright, essayist, columnist, and scholar.

Early life and career
Nawabzada Mirza Jamiluddin Ahmad Khan was born in Delhi, India on 20 January 1925. His father Amiruddin Ahmed Khan was Nawab of Loharu and his mother Syeda Jamila Baigum was a direct descendant of Khwaja Mir Dard and was the fourth wife of Amiruddin Khan. Aali earned a BA in Economics from Anglo Arabic College, Delhi in 1944.

In 1947 after the partition of India, Aali migrated to Karachi, Pakistan on 13 August 1947 with his family and started his career as an assistant in the Ministry of Commerce. In 1951, he passed the CSS (civil service of Pakistan) examination and joined the Pakistan Taxation Service. He was also the Officer on Special Duty at President House from 1959 to 1963. Aali joined the National Bank of Pakistan in 1967 and remained its vice president until his retirement in 1988. In 1971, he obtained an FEL and LLB (law) degree from the University of Karachi.

Jamiluddin Aali was also a former member of the Pakistan Peoples Party and was compelled to contest the 1977 National Assembly elections from NA-191, but lost to Munawwar Hasan of Jamaat-e-Islami. In 1997, Aali was elected as a member of the Senate for a six-year term with support from the Muttahida Qaumi Movement.

Jamiluddin Aali was never very clear nor comfortable answering the question as to why he drifted briefly into politics.

Aali started composing poetry at an early age and wrote many books as well as songs. He wrote the song "Jeevay Jeevay Pakistan" during the 1965 Indo-Pak war which became highly popular. The song was sung by Shahnaz Begum with music arranged by Sohail Rana and was originally released on 14 August 1971 by PTV. During International Women's Year (1976), Aali wrote the song "Hum Maain, Hum Behnain, Hum Baitiyan". He wrote the song "Jo Nam Wohi Pehchan, Pakistan" at the request of former Pakistani President Ghulam Ishaq Khan in 1986. He also wrote the song "Mera Inam Pakistan" by Nusrat Fateh Ali Khan.

Personal life
Aali married Tayyba Bano in 1944. He had three sons and two daughters.

Death
Aali died of a heart attack on 23 November 2015 in Karachi.
His Namaz-I-Janazah was held in the mosque "Tooba" in DHA, Karachi. He was buried in an army graveyard at Bizerta Lines, Karachi on 23 November 2015.

Literary work and activities
Aali became honorary secretary of the Anjuman-i Taraqqi-i Urdu (Association for the Promotion of Urdu Language) in 1962 after the death of Baba-e-Urdu Maulvi Abdul Haq and played a key role there for many years, along with Farman Fatehpuri, to ensure that the association survives and grows.

Aali could also be given credit for playing a major role at the Urdu Lughat Board (Urdu Dictionary Board) when this 22-volume Urdu dictionary was being developed in Pakistan.

Ballads collection
 Aye Mere Dasht-e-Sukhan
 Ghazlain Dohay Geet (six editions)
 Jeeway Jeeway Pakistan (five editions)
 La Hasil (three editions)
 Nai Kiran

Couplets collection
 Dohay (three editions in Urdu and one in Devnagari)
Aali showed his real potential and creativity in his dohas.

Travel literature
 Duniya Mere Aagye
 Tamasha Mere Aagye
 Iceland (a travelogue of Iceland)
 Hurfay (four books)

Songs
 "Aye Watan Ke Sajelay Jawanoo" (sung originally by Noor Jehan during the 1965 war between India and Pakistan)
 "Jeevay Jeevay Pakistan" (sung by Shahnaz Begum originally in 1968, released by PTV on 14 August 1971)
 "Hum Mustafavi Mustafavi Hain" (official song of 1974 Islamic Summit Conference at Lahore), Pakistan (1974)
 "Mein Chota Sa Ek Larka Hoon"
 "Mera Paigham Pakistan" (sung by Nusrat Fateh Ali Khan) (1996)
 "Ab Yeh Andaz-e-Anjuman Hoga"
 "Hum Maain, Hum Behnain, Hum Baitiyan" (1976)
 "Jo Naam Wahi Pehchan, Pakistan Pakistan" (1986)
 "Aye Des Ki Hawaao, Kushboo Mein Bas Ke Jao" (1972)
 "Itne Bare Jewan Sagar Mein, Tu Ne Pakistan Diya" (sung by folk singer Allan Faqir)
 "Yeh Kavita Pakistani Hai" (sung by Nighat Seema)

Awards
 Hilal-e-Imtiaz (Crescent of Excellence) Award (2004) by the President of Pakistan
 Pride of Performance (1991) by the President of Pakistan
 Adamjee Literary Award (1960)
 Dawood Literary Award (1963)
 United Bank Literary Award (1965)
 Habib Bank Literary Award (1965)
 Canadian Urdu Academy Award (1988)
 Sant Kabeer Award – Urdu Conference Delhi (1989)
 Urdu Markaz New York "Nishan-e-Urdu" Award, in the First International Urdu Conference at UNO on 24 June 2000.

References

External links
 Aali  Jee's  Poetic Framework, Professor Dr. Saadat Saeed, Urdu Chair, Ankara University, Turkey

1925 births
2015 deaths
People from Delhi
Muhajir people
Pakistani scholars
Pakistani dramatists and playwrights
Pakistani essayists
Pakistani columnists
Pakistan People's Party politicians
Urdu-language poets from Pakistan
Pakistani civil servants
Delhi University alumni
University of Karachi alumni
Members of the Senate of Pakistan
Recipients of Hilal-i-Imtiaz
Recipients of the Pride of Performance
People from British India
Poets from Karachi
Journalists from Karachi
Politicians from Karachi
Muttahida Qaumi Movement politicians
Urdu-language travel writers
Urdu-language dramatists and playwrights
Urdu-language essayists
20th-century Urdu-language writers
Pakistani songwriters
Recipients of the Adamjee Literary Award
Pakistani travel writers